The Dreamer is the first studio album by American jazz vocalist José James. It was released on Brownswood Recordings in 2008.  A 10th Anniversary Edition was released in 2018, remastered and with 4 additional tracks.

Critical reception
John Fordham of The Guardian gave the album 4 stars out of 5, saying, "James sometimes suggests a 21st-century Leon Thomas (the 1970s singer who became an acid-jazz star), but he also exhibits a highly personal mix of Bobby McFerrin's tonal delicacy and the R&B and soul feel of D'Angelo - with the latter association sometimes reinforced by the way the vocal overdubs and harmonies work." Thomas Barlow of BBC said, "Stripped down and captivatingly raw, this is bonafide jazz all the way."

Adam Greenberg of AllMusic gave the album 4 stars out of 5, saying, "He sings contemporary jazz with a strong sense of respect for the classics, but quietly puts hip-hop instrumentation behind his vocals, and multi-tracks himself for accentuation."

Track listing

Personnel
Credits adapted from liner notes.
 José James – vocals
 Omar Abdulkarim – trumpet
 Nori Ochiai – piano
 Junior Mance – piano
 Ryan Blum – keyboards
 Gal Ben Haim – guitar
 Alexi David – bass guitar, double bass
 Luke Damrosch – drums
 Steve Lyman – drums
 Gilles Peterson – executive production

Charts

References

External links
 

2008 debut albums
Jazz albums by American artists
Vocal jazz albums
Brownswood Recordings albums